Xylopia sericea is a species of plant in the Annonaceae family. It is native to Cerrado vegetation in Brazil.

References

sericea
Endemic flora of Brazil
Flora of the Cerrado